Danica Krstajić (born 1 March 1987) is a Montenegrin former professional tennis player.

She started her tennis career on 10 August 2003, playing for Serbia and Montenegro; and from June 2006 on, she was playing for Montenegro.

Her career-high rankings include No. 223 in singles (October 2007) and No. 162 in doubles (July 2007). She won six ITF tournaments in both singles and doubles. She tried to qualify for a couple of WTA Tour tournaments: in 2005 in Luxembourg and in Hasselt, in 2006 in Warsaw and Linz, and in 2007 again in Linz.

ITF Circuit finals

Singles (6–2)

Doubles (6–4)

External links
 
 
 

1987 births
Living people
Montenegrin female tennis players
Serbia and Montenegro female tennis players